I'm in the Mood for Love is the name of a 1952 album by Eddie Fisher, reissued in 1955, featuring the song of the same name. It was issued as a 10-inch long-playing record by RCA Victor Records. The album peaked at #1 on the pop album chart remaining there for fifteen weeks.

Track listing
"I'm in the Mood for Love" (Jimmy McHugh/Dorothy Fields)
"You'll Never Know" (Harry Warren/Mack Gordon)
"Hold Me" (Jack Little/David Oppenheim/Ira Schuster)
"Everything I Have Is Yours" (Burton Lane/Harold Adamson)
"That Old Feeling" (Sammy Fain/Lew Brown)
"Full Moon and Empty Arms" (Buddy Kaye/Ted Mossman)
"Paradise" (Nacio Herb Brown/Gordon Clifford)
"I've Got You Under My Skin" (Cole Porter)

In 2002 the album, combined with Eddie Fisher Sings and Christmas with Eddie Fisher, was issued on a compact disc.

References

1952 albums
RCA Victor albums
Eddie Fisher (singer) albums